Sirvan County (Kurdish: Şirvan) is in Ilam province, Iran. The capital of the county is the city of Lumar. At the 2006 census, the county's population (as Shirvan District of Chardavol County) was 17,197 in 3,560 households. The following census in 2011 counted 15,855 people in 3,943 households. had been separated from the county to form Sirvan County. It was separated from Chardavol County. The country is populated by Kurds.

Administrative divisions

The population history and structural changes of Sirvan County's administrative divisions over three consecutive censuses are shown in the following table. The latest census shows two districts, four rural districts, and one city.

References

 

Counties of Ilam Province